Radcliffe or Radcliff may refer to:

Places 
 Radcliffe Line, a border between India and Pakistan

United Kingdom 
 Radcliffe, Greater Manchester
 Radcliffe Tower, the remains of a medieval manor house in the town
 Radcliffe tram stop
 Radcliffe, Northumberland
 Radcliffe-on-Trent, Nottinghamshire
 Radcliffe railway station

United States 
 Radcliffe, Iowa
 Radcliff, Kentucky
 Radcliffe, Lexington
 Radcliff, Ohio

Schools 
 Radcliffe College (1879–1999), a former women's college that was associated with Harvard University
 Radcliffe Institute for Advanced Study (1999–present), a postgraduate study institute of Harvard University that has succeeded the former Radcliffe College
 The Radcliffe School, a secondary school in Wolverton, Milton Keynes, England

Other uses 
 Radcliffe (surname), including a list of people with the name
 1420 Radcliffe, a main-belt asteroid
 Radcliffe baronets, a title in the Baronetage of the United Kingdom
 Radcliffe Camera, a library building at Oxford University
 Radcliffe Cricket Club
 Radcliffe Borough F.C., a football club in Radcliffe, Greater Manchester, England
 John Radcliffe Hospital, a hospital in Oxford
 Radcliffe Infirmary, a former hospital in Oxford
 Radcliffe report, a 1959 report on the Bank of England

See also
 Alfred Radcliffe-Brown (1881–1955), English social anthropologist
 Daniel Radcliffe (born 1989), English actor
 Edward Radclyffe (1809–1863), English engraver
 H. Radclyffe Roberts (1906–1982), American entomologist
 John Radcliffe (disambiguation)
 Mark Radcliffe (disambiguation)
 Radclyffe (born 1950), American author
 Radclyffe Hall (1880–1943), British novelist and poet
 The Radclyffe School, Chadderton, England
 Ratcliffe (disambiguation)
 Redcliff (disambiguation)
 Redcliffe (disambiguation)